Xanthomendoza is a genus of small, bright orange foliose lichens with lecanorine apothecia. It is in the family Teloschistaceae. Members of the genus are commonly called sunburst lichens or orange lichens because of their bright orange color.

Members of Xanthomendoza were formerly classified in the genus Xanthoria, but Xanthomendoza members have rhizenes or scattered holdfasts, while Xanthoria do not, and they have different conidia.

Lichen spot tests on the upper cortex are K+ purple, KC−, C−, and P−.

Species
, Species Fungorum accepts 8 species of Xanthomendoza.

Xanthomendoza hermonii 
Xanthomendoza huculica 
Xanthomendoza kashiwadanii 
Xanthomendoza mendozae 
Xanthomendoza oregana 
Xanthomendoza pruinosa 
Xanthomendoza sogdiana 
Xanthomendoza subramulosa

References

Teloschistales
Lichen genera
Teloschistales genera
Taxa described in 1997
Taxa named by Ingvar Kärnefelt